The BCV Building (or Central Bank of Venezuela Building) is an office building located on Avenida Urdaneta, Caracas, Venezuela and is the headquarters of the Banco Central de Venezuela. it is also the largest funder of the city and is covering 27.000 m² on the street level. The building was completed in 1965 and was opened the same year, a second compound was built in 1967, which is a tower that reaches 117 meters high and has 26 floors.

References 
 Building information

Skyscraper office buildings in Venezuela
Buildings and structures in Caracas
Office buildings completed in 1967